Westfield La Part-Dieu mall is a major shopping centre inside Lyon-Part-Dieu Business District, in the 3rd arrondissement of Lyon, France. It used to be one of Europe's largest downtown shopping center when it opened on September the 8th, 1975. Located in front of La Part-Dieu train station, it is currently undergoing renovation works, according to a Winy Maas overhaul design.

History 

Gallery

See also 
La Part-Dieu

References

Buildings and structures in Lyon
Shopping malls established in 1975
Shopping centres in France
Tourist attractions in Lyon